The Junior Dagar Brothers were Nasir Zahiruddin (1933–1994) and Nasir Faiyazuddin (1934–1989), a pair of Indian singers of the classical dhrupad genre. They were the 19th generation of an unbroken chain of the Dagarvani Dhrupad tradition. Their father, vocalist Nasiruddin Khan, died in 1936, and consequently they learned dhrupad from their elder brothers, the Senior Dagar Brothers, Nasir Moinuddin Dagar and Nasir Aminuddin Dagar.

The brothers were born in Indore, Madhya Pradesh. Their musical career unfolded in Delhi. After the untimely demise of Nasir Moinuddin Dagar in Calcutta in 1967 they became the only pair carrying on the jugalbandi singing. The Dagar Brothers took Dhrupad to Europe, America and Japan. In India they formed the Dhrupad Society to popularise Dhrupad, inviting exponents from all gharanas to share their platform. They also trained many students, including Faiyaz Wasifuddin Dagar, the son of Nasir Faiyazuddin Dagar.

1933 births
1994 deaths
Musicians from Indore
Dagarvani
Rajasthani people
Hindustani singers
20th-century Indian Muslims
Singers from Madhya Pradesh
Recipients of the Sangeet Natak Akademi Award
20th-century Indian male classical singers
Indian musical duos
Sibling musical duos
JVC Records artists